Deepak Nehra is an Indian freestyle wrestler, who competes in the 97 kg category. He won a bronze medal in the 2022 Birmingham Commonwealth Games.

References

Living people
Indian male sport wrestlers
Wrestlers at the 2022 Commonwealth Games
Commonwealth Games bronze medallists for India
Commonwealth Games medallists in wrestling
21st-century Indian people
Year of birth missing (living people)
Medallists at the 2022 Commonwealth Games